Stavanger (US usually) is a city and municipality in Norway. It is the fourth largest city and third largest metropolitan area in Norway (through conurbation with neighboring Sandnes) and the administrative center of Rogaland county. The municipality is the fourth most populous in Norway. Located on the Stavanger Peninsula in southwest Norway, Stavanger counts its official founding year as 1125, the year the Stavanger Cathedral was completed. Stavanger's core is to a large degree 18th- and 19th-century wooden houses that are protected and considered part of the city's cultural heritage. This has caused the town center and inner city to retain a small-town character with an unusually high ratio of detached houses, and has contributed significantly to spreading the city's population growth to outlying parts of Greater Stavanger.

The city's population rapidly grew in the late 20th century due to its oil industry. Stavanger is known today as the Oil Capital of Norway. Norwegian energy company Equinor, the largest company in the Nordic region, has its headquarters in Stavanger. Multiple educational institutions for higher education are located in Stavanger. The largest of these is the University of Stavanger.

Domestic and international military installations are located in Stavanger, including the NATO Joint Warfare Centre. Other international establishments, and especially local branches of foreign oil and gas companies, contribute further to a significant foreign population in the city. The city has a strong international profile and 22,1% of the population has an immigrant background. In 2020, it was rated as the most liveable city for Europeans expatriates in Norway as well as 5th in Europe by ECA International. Stavanger has, since the early 2000s, consistently had an unemployment rate significantly lower than the European average. In August 2022, the unemployment rate was 1.6%. The city is also among those that frequent various lists of most expensive cities in the world, and Stavanger has even been ranked as the world's most expensive city by certain indices.

The climate of the city is very mild by Nordic standards due to a strong maritime influence. As a result, winter usually remains above freezing whereas heat waves are rare and seldom long. Rainfall is common, although less so than in areas further north on the coastline.

Stavanger is served by international airport Stavanger Airport, Sola, which offers flights to cities in most major European countries, as well as a limited number of intercontinental charter flights. The airport was rated as one of the world's most punctual airports of its category by OAG in 2020.

Every two years, Stavanger organizes the Offshore Northern Seas (ONS), which is the second largest exhibition and conference for the energy sector. The Gladmat food festival is also held each year and is considered to be one of Scandinavia's leading food festivals. The city is also known for being one of the nation's premier culinary clusters. Stavanger was awarded the 2008 European Capital of Culture alongside Liverpool.

History

The first traces of settlement in the Stavanger region come from the days when the ice retreated after the last ice age c. 10,000 years ago. A number of historians have argued convincingly that North-Jæren was an economic and military center as far back as the 9th and 10th centuries with the consolidation of the nation at the Battle of Hafrsfjord around 872. Stavanger grew into a center of church administration and an important south-west coast market town around 1100–1300.

Stavanger fulfilled an urban role prior to its status as city (1125), from around the time the Stavanger bishopric was established in the 1120s. Bishop Reinald, who may have come from Winchester, England, is said to have started construction of Stavanger Cathedral (Stavanger domkirke) around 1100. It was finished around 1125, and the city of Stavanger counts 1125 as its year of foundation.

With the Protestant Reformation in 1536, Stavanger's role as a religious center declined, and the establishment of Kristiansand in the early 17th century led to the relocation of the bishopric. However, rich herring fisheries in the 19th century gave the city new life.

Stavanger was established as a municipality on 1 January 1838 (see formannskapsdistrikt). On 1 January 1867, a small area of Hetland municipality (population: 200) was transferred to the city of Stavanger. Again on 1 January 1879, another area of Hetland (population: 1,357) was transferred to Stavanger.  Then again on 1 January 1906, the city again annexed another area of Hetland (population: 399).  On 1 July 1923, part of Hetland (population: 3,063) was moved to the city once again.  Finally on 1 July 1953, a final portion of Hetland (population: 831) was moved to Stavanger. In the 1960s, the work of the Schei Committee pushed for many municipal mergers across Norway.  As a result of this, on 1 January 1965, the city of Stavanger (population: 51,470) was merged with the neighboring municipalities of Madla (population: 6,025) and most of Hetland (population: 20,861).

The city's history is a continuous alternation between economic booms and recessions. For long periods of time its most important industries have been shipping, shipbuilding, the fish canning industry and associated subcontractors.

In 1969, a new boom started as oil was first discovered in the North Sea.
After much discussion, Stavanger was chosen to be the on-shore center for the oil industry on the Norwegian sector of the North Sea, and a period of hectic growth followed.

On 1 January 2020, the neighboring municipalities of Finnøy and Rennesøy merged with Stavanger to form a new, larger municipality.

City development

Stavanger is one of Norway's oldest cities. It emerged in the 12th century during a period of population growth and increasing urbanisation throughout northern Europe. The archaeological and historical sources about the first city development are sparse. Therefore, there is much we do not know about the first city development. It stands out as an important area from early times, as a desirable foothold for the monarchy and the church, as both needed a strong foothold in the South West coast area. In North Jæren, rich archaeological material suggests that the chiefs held considerable power from the early Iron Age. Stavanger had a natural harbor and was, with Jæren in the south, strategically important to the county of the East as well as to the shipping route along the western coast and the fertile Ryfylke Islands in the north.

The earliest Christian impulses in Norway came to Stavanger region through trade connections with Continental Europe and Great Britain. This flourished during the Viking era. In the mid 10th century, traditional Norse burial customs ceased in the Stavanger area, at the same time as the first Christian priests began their work. Big stone crosses are visible memorials of this early Christian age (including the Tjora and Kvitsøy). On the overland approach to Stavanger, a memorial cross of HERS and lendmann Erling Skjalgsson was erected after his fall in 1028. Erling controlled power over the South West coast, and the location of the cross indicates that he had a special connection to Stavanger. The inscription on the cross shows a priest was responsible for the inscription, and he may have performed an early service at a church on site.

Archaeological investigations in the current downtown and in the crypt of the Cathedral show that the great fire of 1272 probably left large parts of the city and the cathedral in ruins, including the Romanesque chancel of the cathedral. The reconstruction after the fire led to the cathedral's Western Front being replaced with a vestibule, as well as to the construction (or reconstruction) of St. Mary's Church, Bishop's Chapel, the Gothic cathedral and the expansion of the stone cellar at Kongsberg.

Stavanger has a long history of education in Western Europe. It was the monastery here that first saw the need to train new employees through education. The first organized teaching in the city probably took place at a Benedictine monastery in the town, either Olav's Monastery or Monastery of people from the mid-12th century.

One of the most important events in Stavanger's city history was the gift letter that King Magnus Erlingsson gave to Stavanger Bishop Eirik Ivarsson in the second half of the 1100s. Exactly when the king made this gift letter, and under what circumstances it happened, is unknown. It may have been in 1163–1164, in connection with the King Magnus's coronation, but could also have been around 1181–1184, in connection with the support Stavanger Bishop Erik gave King Magnus at the end of the king's fight against the late King Sverre.

It is undoubtedly correct to characterize Stavanger as a church city throughout the Middle Ages, up to the Reformation. The Reformation, however, dealt a hard blow to the Church in specific and Stavanger in general. The cathedral, the bishop and canons of the monastery had been large landowners. Recession of the city began with the loss of people in rural areas, as a result of which the revenues of the cathedral and the bishop fell dramatically due to reduced rental income. In 1537 the bishop's and the monastery's estate and property was confiscated by the king. Kongsberg was plundered by Christoffer Trondsen in 1539, at which time St. Swithun's casket disappeared and Bishop Hoskuld Hoskuldsson may have been executed.

World War II

In a prelude to the invasion, on 8 April, the German freighter  (6,780 grt.) anchored by Ulsnes. Roda was reportedly loaded with coke, but customs officials and police authorities became suspicious about other cargo when they observed that the ship was not riding deep in the water. The ship was boarded and was ordered to move to Riska. After sending the crew off in lifeboats, Æger used 25 shots with  Bofors guns to sink Roda.

Early on the morning of 9 April 1940, explosions and bomb blasts from Sola-edge and news bulletins on radio announced the German attack on Norway. Sola Airport was the Germans' first target on North Jæren. The airport was attacked by six German Messerschmitt Bf 110 fighters at around 8 am. The airport had been built in 1937, and in April 1940 fortifications round the airport were not yet complete. Fortifications consisted of a concrete bunker still under construction and several open shooting positions. Armament consisted of three heavy anti-aircraft machine guns, three heavy machine guns configured for ground targets, and some light machine guns at the disposal of the approximately 80 soldiers who defended the airport. The bomber wing was transferred to Sola Airport in 1939, but the planes, a total of six Fokker and three Caproni aircraft, were old and outdated. Shortly after the attack began, however, they took off.

The German air attack increased in intensity. The bombardment lasted for about an hour before 10 slow Ju 52 transport aircraft arrived over the airport. They had taken off from the airport at Hamburg a few hours earlier. In a parachute assault, the transport planes first dropped yellow containers containing weapons and equipment, then between 10 and 12 paratroopers from each plane. This was only the second ever wartime parachute assault; the first had occurred only three hours earlier, when a bridge south of Denmark was captured in the same way. At the Sola airport, the concrete bunker held out longest, but was eventually put out of action with a hand grenade. While Norwegian soldiers were badly injured in the attempted defense, there were no fatalities; in contrast, the Germans lost several. Lieutenant Thor Tang, who led the Norwegian defense of the airport, capitulated at 10:00, and the Germans immediately began landing troops, fuel and other supplies. In all, 200 to 300 transport aircraft arrived in Sola during invasion day, and by evening several hundred soldiers and large quantities of materiel had been moved from Germany to Sola.

By around 12:30 on 9 April, the first German troops advanced into Stavanger without resistance. The police station, telephone office, telegraph center, post office, port office, customs house and the gas company were the most important places, and now came under control of the Germans. The city was conquered without conflict, but the first sparks of resistance had been ignited, and several men left the city and made their way to the Norwegian troops inside Gjesdal, there to join the armed struggle against the enemy.

The Germans had placed a high priority to have a good railway connection between the air base at Sola – Stavanger district, and the rest of the country. However, it was not until 29 April 1944, that the Southern Railway was completed to Stavanger. In 1940, the Germans had envisioned it to be completed no later than 1 November 1941.

After Hitler's death in 1945, Grand Admiral Karl Dönitz took over leadership of the German forces, and on 9 May 1945, gave the head of the German armed forces in Norway, General Franz Böhme, orders that "Reichskommissar" in Norway, Josef Terboven, was deposed and that all his duties were transferred to Böhme. To Böhme, in turn, he gave the task of how the capitulation of Festung Norwegen was to be implemented. There were around 15,000 German soldiers in Rogaland in 1945, and it was there where the commander of 274 Infantry Division, General Weckman, gave the formal German surrender.

Before repatriation, the Germans were required to remain and clean up after five years of occupation. There were 180 German minefields in Rogaland, with a total of 480,000 mines, all of which the German Wehrmacht were required to clear. Sixty-two Germans were killed and 94 were injured during mine clearance in Rogaland. Mines from this period continue to be uncovered.

Oil capital

In 1969, a new boom started as oil was first discovered in the North Sea.

After much discussion, Stavanger was chosen to be the on-shore center for the oil industry on the Norwegian sector of the North Sea, and a period of hectic growth followed.

In March 1965 an agreement was signed between Norway and the United Kingdom on the sharing of the continental shelf by the median line principle. That same year a similar agreement was signed between Norway and Denmark. It was designed as a legal regime for oil exploration. The first licensing round on the Norwegian shelf was announced on 13 April 1965, and in August of that same year the government granted 22 licenses for 78 blocks for oil companies or groups of companies. The production license gave oil companies exclusive rights to exploration, drilling and production in a defined geographical area for a given period at an annual fee. Esso was the first oil company to start drilling for oil off the coast of Norway.

Coat of arms
Hallvard Trætteberg (1898–1987), a leading specialist in heraldry, was commissioned to design the official coat of arms of Stavanger, a work that lasted from the end of the 1920s until approved on 11 August 1939. His design is also used as the city's arms, flag, and seal. The coat of arms is based upon a seal which dated from 1591. It shows a branch of vine (Vitis vinifera). Which leaves and branch type that is depicted on the coat of arms has been hotly debated. The original meaning and representation of the vine remains unknown.

Origin of the name
The Old Norse form of the name was Stafangr. The origin of the name has been discussed for decades, and the most used interpretation is that it originally was the name of the inlet now called Vågen, which was the original site of the city, on the east shore of the bay.

The first element of the name is stafr meaning 'staff' or 'branch'. This could refer to the form of the inlet, but also to the form of the mountain Valberget (Staven meaning 'the staff,' is a common name of high and steep mountains in Norway). The last element is angr meaning 'inlet, bay'. Facing the North Sea, Stavanger has always been economically dependent on its access to the sea.

Government
All municipalities in Norway, including Stavanger, are responsible for primary education (through 10th grade), outpatient health services, senior citizen services, unemployment and other social services, zoning, economic development, and municipal roads. The municipality is governed by a municipal council of elected representatives, which in turn elects a mayor.

Municipal council
The municipal council of Stavanger is made up of 67 representatives who are elected to four year terms.  Currently, the party breakdown is as follows:

Geography

The municipality of Stavanger is located in a coastal landscape, bordering the sea to the west and Boknafjorden in the northeast. The Byfjorden and Gandsfjorden run along the east side of the city. It is part of the Low-Jæren, a flat area of land consisting mostly of marsh, sand, and stone aur, that ranges from Ogna River in the south to Tungenes in the north; it is the northernmost part that includes Stavanger. The landscape has a distinctive appearance with rocks and hills where there is no settlement or agriculture. The city of Stavanger is closely linked to the sea and water, with five lakes (including Breiavatnet, Stora Stokkavatnet, and Mosvatnet) and three fjords (Hafrsfjorden, Byfjorden, and Gandsfjorden); sea and water form the landscape, providing a shoreline rich with vegetation and wildlife.

The city has developed on both sides of a hollow that runs right through the terrain, with steep slopes up from the bottom. An extension of Boknafjorden and Byfjorden intersects the harbour into the hollow from the northwest, while Hillevåg lake intrudes from Gandsfjorden in the southeast. Breiavatnet is located between the two fjord arms.

The city includes many islands off the coast including: Bjørnøy, Buøy, Engøy, Grasholmen, Hellesøy, Hundvåg, Kalvøy, Lindøy, Sølyst, and Vassøy.  It also includes the eastern half of the island of Åmøy.

Parks

There are several parks and green spots in Stavanger municipality, both in the city and beyond. Central to the town is the city lake which is in turn surrounded by the city park, built as the city's first urban park in 1866–1868. Between the city park and the bay is located Kielland garden, which got its name because the poet Alexander Kielland's house at the time was here. Kielland Park went through a major renovation in 2007 as part of the Millennium in Stavanger municipality. At the opposite end of the city lake there is a small park outside the station; here there is Emigration, a gift from the Norwegian emigrants in the United States, commemorating the men and women of Norwegian ancestry who built America.

Bjergstedparken, a park north of Old Stavanger, is the location of Bjergsted Music Center, including Stavanger Concert Hall, and its outdoor areas are often used for festivals and outdoor concerts. The Missing park, built in honour of Lars Missing, is located up the hill on the west side of the harbour, and forms the entrance from the south towards the Old Town. Canon park forms the border between Stavanger and the exit from the E39. Northward go Løkkeveien against Bjergsted westward go Madlaveien the theater and Bergelandstunnelen, east towards E39. The park is located next to old Stavanger Hospital, which also has a large park area around the main building. Through the park runs Kannik creek, which comes to the surface at the statue of the Little Mermaid and runs into Breiavannet. Kannikkbekken runs mostly underground, in pipes, before it reaches Kannik park.

Outside the city center, the park southerly in relation to the large inland lakes such as Mosvatnet, Stora Stokkavatnet and Water Assen. Mosvatnet is  making it the third largest in Stavanger after Hålandsvatnet and Store Stokkavatn. The lake supplied the city's drinking water from 1863 to 1931, and is now by far the most used recreation area in Stavanger. At the south end is Mosvangen Camping, Stavanger Svømmestadion old man and Vålandskogen, and to the west is Rogaland Kunstmuseum. Stora Stokkavatnet is  – the largest in Stavanger. Right at Stora Stokkavatnet is the  Litla Stokkavatnet. In the lake is a small island, Storeholmen. Store Stokkavatnet supplied Stavanger's drinking water from 1931 to 1959, and was later demoted to the reserve drinking water. In 2009 it was relegated once more, and it is now legal to swim in the water.

Climate
Situated on the south west coast of Norway, Stavanger's climate is greatly influenced by the temperate water in the North Sea, and Atlantic lows giving mild westerlies also in winter. This creates warmer temperatures throughout the year compared to other cities at similar latitudes, and also gives plentiful precipitation in the form of rain, especially in late autumn and winter. 
According to Köppen climate classification, Stavanger experiences a temperate oceanic climate (Cfb) with five months with a mean temperature above . Spring and early summer is the driest season. The all-time high  at the airport was recorded August 1975. The warmest month on record at Stavanger Airport is August 2002 with mean  and average daily high . The all-time low  was recorded January 1987. The coldest month on record is February 1963 with mean  and average daily low . The average date for the last overnight freeze (low below ) in spring is April 20 and average date for first freeze in autumn is October 31 giving a frost-free season of 193 days (Stavanger Airport Sola 1981-2010 average).

Boroughs

Stavanger is officially partitioned into 22 parts and 218 subparts. Stavanger is also divided into seven boroughs.

Neighborhoods 
Neighborhoods include:

Economy

In the early 20th century, Stavanger's industry was mainly related to fisheries and shipping. In the first half of the century it was known for canning, and in the 1950s there were over 50 canneries in town. The town was even called Norway's "canned capital", and included Christian Bjelland, who founded Chr Bjelland & Co. A/S. The last of these factories were closed down in 2002.

Around 1950, over half of the working population in the city was employed in industry. Structural changes in industry and the strong development of the service sector have radically changed the city's economic base, and the service industry now represents over 11 percent of employment. However, the city still has 29 percent of the county's industrial employment.

Engineering is now the main industry with 59 percent of manufacturing employment. This is mostly related to the offshore petroleum industry, and production of oil platforms alone account for 40 percent. Other important industries are publishing – especially high printing and the major daily newspapers in town, Stavanger and Rogaland Avis Aftenblad – and food and beverage, which includes the processing of local agricultural products from Jæren, including Gilde Vest with one of the largest slaughterhouses.

Employment by place of work and industry in 2007 to 0.6% in primary, 27.4% in secondary and tertiary industries 71.7%. Employment by place of work by sector in 2007 to 24.4% in the public sector and 75.6% in the private sector and public enterprises.

Industry has in recent years become highly decentralized. The most important of the newer industrial areas are Forus in the south, on the border of Sandnes and Sola, and Dusavik (mainly petroleum-related activities) in the north, on the border of Randfontein. Significant older industrial areas are Hillevåg, Buøy, the eastern districts, and in some places elsewhere along the coast. Shipbuilding and shipping has also traditionally been of great importance to the city's economic growth, and Rosenberg Shipyard, established in 1896, is located on Hundvåg. Today Stavanger is also among the country's most important maritime cities, coming in fourth for registered fleets after the cities of Oslo, Bergen and Ålesund.

For the fourth consecutive year, Stavanger Region was in 2007 ranked best business region. Telemarksforsking Bo worked with Ministry NM to rank the regions in Norway with regard to profitability, growth and new businesses.

Media

The city's largest daily newspaper, Stavanger Aftenblad came out with its first issue in 1893. Competitor Rogalands Avis was first published in 1899 under the name 1ste Mai ('1 May'), and published daily. In 1987 an attempt was made to establish a new daily newspaper, The West Coast, but it was only released for two months and ended with a total loss of NOK 27 million.

The first newspaper published in Stavanger, "Stavangerske Adressecontoirs Efterretninger", was a handwritten weekly newspaper that probably came out in 1769 and 1770. This was not an ordinary newspaper, but a so-called link newspaper with the privilege of bringing out announcements, small articles and ads. The first printed newspaper in Stavanger, "Stavanger Addresseavis", published its first issue on Friday, 4 October 1833.

Stavanger Avis was published from 1888 until 1911. Writer and local Alexander L. Kielland was editor in 1889. Stavanger Avis was also the name of the newspaper that came out from 1942 to 1945, when Stavanger Aftenblad and Stavangeren were merged by the Press Directorate.

Student newspaper SMiS (Studentmediene i Stavanger) comes out every other month.

Stavanger has one principal television station, TV Vest, that sends local news and reports. Additionally, Viking TV, the channel for the football team Viking FK, started on 2 March 2008, and is distributed via Lyse's broadband network, reaching 120,000 viewers in 45,000 households. NRK Rogaland supplies local news broadcasts on radio and television. Local radio stations also provide local news and reports.

Agriculture and food

Stavanger region is often referred to as Norway's answer to the French food region of Lyon.  The Culinary Institute, based in Ullandhaug, provided a very important focus on food in Stavanger. After the Culinary Institute went bankrupt, partly due to activities in Oslo on 4 June 2008, a new culinary organization was established by the Foundation Rogaland knowledge park and Rogaland County Council. This new institute, now also known as The Culinary Institute, maintained parts of the work of the original organization, and eventually bought back the name, logo and brand Culinary Institute from the bankruptcy estate.

In summer 2007, the region's culinary actors were awarded the title "Norwegian Centers of Expertise in Culinology." The building under construction at Ullandhaug will serve as a platform and innovative arena, not only for the region's R & D environment, but also for other expertise among both industry and the public. In July 2008 the Stavanger European championship qualified for the Bocuse d' Or. In 2008, Norway was represented by Geir Skeie, who also won gold. Every year there is a "Happy Food Festival" in the city center. The festival originated in the network of Rogaland county so that they could impart culinary traditions of the region. By 2020, Stavanger region intends to be the region most Norwegians associate with food products and culinary experiences.

Oil industry

In recent times, the city has come to be called the "oil capital," and Norway's national and largest oil company, Equinor, is based at Forus, in Stavanger. Equinor (at the time known as Statoil) was founded as a limited company owned by the Government of Norway on 14 July 1972 by a unanimous act passed by the Norwegian parliament Stortinget, to enable Norwegian participation in the oil industry on the continental shelf, to build up Norwegian competency within the petroleum industry, and to establish the foundations of a domestic petroleum industry. Establishing Equinor's headquarters in Stavanger naturally led to Stavanger becoming the center of the oil industry. Petoro, a Norwegian state-owned company responsible for managing the commercial aspects of the state's direct financial interest in petroleum activities on the Norwegian continental shelf, also has its headquarters in the city. With the center of the national oil industry in Stavanger, several other international oil companies have also made their headquarters in Stavanger.

NPD was created in 1972 by Ullandhaug and PSA was established on 1 January 2004 and co-located with the agency, as a regulatory body.

Jåttåvågen, on Gandsfjorden, was from the 1970s to the 1990s a large industrial area, particularly for the construction of large concrete Condeep platforms and oil platforms for the offshore industry. Among others, the Condeep jacket for the three Gullfaks platforms and Troll A were cast here by Norwegian Contractors.

Offshore Northern Seas is the second largest exhibition of its kind in the oil and gas industry. ONS takes place in Stavanger during the last week of August every other year. In 2008, there were 38,000 visitors, half of whom came from abroad.

Transport

Airport

Stavanger Airport, Sola, is located in Sola, 14 minutes away from Stavanger city center. The airport opened in 1937. In 1940 Stavanger Airport, Forus, opened, but closed in 1989. In 2013 Sola airport had over 4 million passengers and was the largest airport in Rogaland county. It is also the 3rd largest airport in Norway and 7th in the Nordic countries. The busiest route is Oslo-Gardermoen, with over 1.5 million passengers; the second most popular is Bergen Airport, Flesland, with over 700,000 passengers; Oslo-Torp is the third most popular, followed by Trondheim Airport, Værnes and Kristiansand Airport, Kjevik domestically. Internationally, the busiest routes are Copenhagen, Amsterdam, and Aberdeen. Stavanger also has connections to domestic and European destinations, including London, Paris, Barcelona, Stockholm, Warsaw. Domestic destinations are all the way up from Tromsø down to Kristiansand.

Railway

Stavanger Station opened in 1878 and is the terminus of both the Sørlandet Line and the Jæren Line.

The Southern Railway goes from Oslo Central Station to Drammen, to Kristiansand Station, to, finally, Stavanger Station. This route, 545 kilometres (339 mi) between Oslo and Stavanger, is scheduled over four times every day and takes around seven hours. The railway was constructed in several phases, the first section being opened in 1871 and the last not opened until 1944. While there was continual construction work from Oslo westward as far as Moi, the Jæren Line, from Egersund to Stavanger in Western Norway, was opened in 1878. Up to 1913 the name used on plans and for the completed sections was the Vestlandet Line (The West Country Line).

There are also local trains in Jæren with 19 stops on one line. The line opened as a 1,067 mm (3 ft 6 in) narrow gauge stand-alone line on 27 February 1878. The railway was extended from Egersund to Flekkefjord as the Flekkefjord Line in 1904. The Jæren Line's only branch, the Ålgård Line from Ganddal to Ålgård, opened in 1924. In 1944, the Sørlandet Line was extended to Sira on the Flekkefjord Line, and the Jæren Line was integrated into the main railway network. Because of this, the line was converted to standard gauge.

Roads

European route E39 goes through Stavanger via the Mastrafjord Tunnel and Byfjord Tunnel, then goes south to Sandnes. Fylkesvei 44 starts from Stavanger and ends in Kristiansand, via Sandnes and Flekkefjord.

National road 509 runs between Tasta Borough through Tananger, Sola and Stavanger Airport, and Forus, ending at E39 near Jåtten.

On 18 December 2012, the new engine traffic road Solasplitten opened as a new thoroughfare eastward, north of Forus and the European route E39.

An undersea road tunnel connects Stavanger to Strand via the Ryfast tunnel link. (Ryfylke Tunnel and Hundvåg Tunnel).

There is as of 2021 ongoing construction of Rogfast, an undersea road tunnel that will facilitate travel between Stavanger and Haugesund.

Sea

Located outside Stavanger, there is a port serving ferries to Hirtshals, Denmark. There have been advocates for the Smyril Line ferry between the Faroe Islands and Denmark to make a stop in Stavanger as the new port in Risavika allows this to be done while only adding one hour to the total sailing time.

Local ferries go to Tau and Kvitsøy, while fast passenger boats go to many villages and islands between the main routes from Stavanger to Haugesund and Sauda.

There are plans to re-establish the ferry link to Newcastle in the United Kingdom, which was suspended in 2008.

Bus

The local bus service in Stavanger is administered by Rogaland Kollektivtrafikk (RKT) under the brand name "Kolumbus". The buses are operated by Boreal Transport. RKT administers all bus routes in Rogaland County.

Express bus services are operated by NOR-WAY Bussekspress from Stavanger City Terminal to Kristiansand, Bergen and Haugesund, and by Lavprisekspressen to Oslo via Kristiansand.

The city has a number of bus services and taxis.

Education

University of Stavanger (UIS) is the fifth university established in Norway, on 29 October 2004, when Høgskolen i Stavanger (HiS) gained university status by decision of the Council. The university has about 9,000 students and 1,200 employees and is organized into three faculties: Faculty of Humanities, Social Sciences and the Faculty of Science. The archaeological museum is also part of the university. The campus is located in Ullandhaug, with most departments located there. Marit Boyesen was selected as the principal for the period 2011 to 2015, and started her tenure as rector 1 August 2011. As rector, she is the head of the academic activities of the University of Stavanger as well as Chairman of the University Board. The University of Stavanger became a member of European Consortium of Innovative Universities (ECIU) in October 2012.

The VID Specialized University has a long history in the city. This university began as the School of Mission and Theology or Misjonshøgskolen (MHS), being established in 1843 and accredited in 2008 as a research university. It has about 300 students from approximately 20 countries. MHS is owned by the Norwegian Missionary Society. The Centre for Intercultural Communication (SIK) is associated with the college's mission. In 2016 it became part of the VID Specialized University.

The Art School in Rogaland was established in 1978, with a history dating back to 1957.

The Scandinavian School of Management offers college studies in Marketing and Management. The school is 92.5% owned by John Bauer Group.

Solborgveien Folk annually welcomes over 140 students and is owned by the Lutheran.

Other private schools include the International School of Stavanger, The British International School of Stavanger and Stavanger French school, which is in the same premises as Eiganes School.

Other schools in the city are the Enterprise Technical College Stavanger, Noroff Institute Stavanger, Utdanningshuset Stavanger, Acta Bible, BI Stavanger, Fjelltun Bible, Folkeuniversitetet Stavanger, Imente Vocational School Stavanger, Nor Offshore Stavanger, Norwegian School of Creative Studies Stavanger, NæringsAkademiet Stavanger Peteka – Stavanger, PNI Training Center and Stavanger Offshore Technical College.

The high schools are categorized under Rogaland county, but specifically within Stavanger municipality are the schools St. Olav, St. Svithun, Stavanger Cathedral School, Hetland, Jåttå, Stavanger Offshore Technical College, Godalen and Bergeland.

Culture

Museums

The city has several museums and collections that are both local and national. The city's most visited museum is the Norwegian Petroleum Museum, opened in 1998. In its 10 years of visitation records, from 1998 to 2008, almost 95,000 people visited the museum annually.

The city's oldest museum is Missjonmuseet, established in 1864, located on the ground floor of the faculty building at MHS. The museum has about 5,000 exhibits consisting of several objects of ethnographic and historical interest from the various mission fields of study.

Stavanger Museum, founded in 1877 and thus one of the oldest museums, includes several historic buildings and collections. Stavanger Museum consists of a total of eight buildings: Stavanger Museum Muségata 16, Stavanger Maritime Museum, the Norwegian Canning Museum, Ledaal, Breidablikkveien museum, combined indretning, Norwegian Printing Museum and the Norwegian Children's Museum. In the main museum are now a cultural department, a zoological collection, and a library.

Museum of Archaeology in Stavanger is the largest museum in Stavanger, measured by number of employees. AmS is a state museum for the prehistoric sites in Rogaland, and is part of the University of Stavanger. The museum also conducts extensive outreach activities, and has facilities fairly close to Stavanger Museum.

Rogaland Art Museum, located by a park, has paintings by Norwegian artist Edvard Munch, Christian Krogh, Eilif Peterssen and Harriet Backer, and also has the largest collection of Lars Hertervigs work. Other artists of Rogaland represented here include Kitty Kielland, Nicolai Ulfsten, Carl Sundt-Hansen, Olaf Lange and Aage Storstein.

Vestlandske School Museum (Western Norway School Museum), in Stavanger, is currently in the old 1920 Kvaleberg school building. Established in 1925, it is a museum of school history in Rogaland.

By the bay lies the Norwegian Emigration Center on the west side and on the eastern side of the bay is Valbergtårnet with his vektermuseeum. Norwegian Telecom Museum has an office in Stavanger, at Løkkeveien.

Churches
The Church of Norway has two deaneries (prosti) within the municipality of Stavanger: the Stavanger arch-deanery and the Ytre Stavanger deanery.  The two deaneries are divided up into 17 parishes (sokn), all of which are part of the Diocese of Stavanger.

Film

Local filmmaking
South West Film Forum was established in 1992 and is an organization of film workers in Rogaland. Its goal is to increase the skills of film workers in the region and encourage more filmmaking. Film Forum Southwest has received operating support from the City of Stavanger since 1995 and from the county since 1997. Additionally, they have received grants for film workshop from the county and for other industry-stimulating measures from Stavanger municipality.

Stavanger has since 1997 had a grant for the support of local filmmaking. The aim has been to stimulate the local film community growth and development, and to contribute to local filmmakers so they can initiate film projects that can then apply for production funding from other government agencies. In addition, they support the already completed projects – primarily to help cinemas display locally produced film.

The feature film Mongoland became a Norwegian film success, made outside the traditional infrastructure for Norwegian film. So far this has culminated with the establishment of the production company South West Film and Film Kraft Rogaland, to ensure long-term fund allocations to filmproduksjoner. Arild Østin Ommundsen made his directorial debut with the feature film Mongoland in 2000 and has since directed and written the script for The Haunting (2003) and Monster Thursday (2005). Ommundsen helped start the new Stavanger wave that came after Mongoland premiered, and several of the actors who were instrumental have since enjoyed great success.

Stavanger native Stian Kristiansen, who had his acting breakthrough in the feature film "Mongoland", debuted as a feature film director with the film interpretation of Tore Renberg's book The Man Who Loved Yngve. The film, of the same title, had its theatrical release on 15 February 2008. The film has received top marks in Norwegian media, and was watched by over 30,000 people during the premiere weekend. In 2008, Kristiansen received Stavanger's screenplay scholarship.

On 30 September 2010, the film Nokas, directed by Erik Skjoldbjærg, premiered in Stavanger. The film is about the NOKAS robbery in Stavanger on 5 April 2004, and was filmed on location, using many of the locations where the factual event took place, such as the King Street counting center, in the Norway Bank building, and the Cathedral Square, by Maria Church Ruins. The family of the police officer who died during the robbery has not authorized the film.

TV
Lykkeland (″State of Happiness″), a Norwegian drama series of so far 16 episodes in two seasons, premiered with the first season on NRK1 in 2018. The series is about the time when Norway enters the oil age and follows some families and people in Stavanger who experience great upheavals when the city goes from being a pietistic community with fishing, shipping and agriculture as main industries, to becoming an international, rich oil city. The second season premiered on 2 January 2022 and deals with dramatic events in the 1970s and 1980s.

The series won two awards during the newly started CannesSeries Festival in Cannes in 2018. The first season of the series won five awards during the Gullruten ("Golden Screen", Norway) 2019 – best drama series, best actress for Anne Regine Ellingsæter, best director TV drama for Petter Næss and Pål Jackman, best screenplay in TV drama for Mette Marit Bølstad and best costume for Karen Fabritius Gram. During the Gullruten 2022, the second season of the series won five awards, among them best supporting role for Pia Tjelta and best director TV drama for Petter Næss.

European Capital of Culture 2008

Stavanger and its region, along with Liverpool, United Kingdom, was selected as a European Capital of Culture for 2008. The Stavanger2008 vision is expressed through the concept "Open Port". This can be understood both in its English sense – "an open harbour" – and in its Norwegian meaning of "an open gate", together implying openness towards the world. The region and its people is supposed to be even more open and inclusive towards art, ideas and opportunities.

Stavanger was the host port of the Cutty Sark Tall Ships' Race in 1997 and 2004.

Sport and recreation

The largest local football club in Stavanger is Viking FK, one of the most successful football clubs in Norwegian history, having won a total of eight league titles and five Norwegian Football Cup titles. The club plays its home matches at SR-Bank Arena, which was opened in 2004.

After a short stint in the second-tier division, OBOS-ligaen, in the 2018 season, Viking FK was once again promoted to the top-tier Eliteserien, and is to date the club with the most seasons at the highest level of Norwegian football, along with Trondheim rival Rosenborg BK.

FK Vidar, another local football club, currently plays in the Norwegian second division, the third highest level on the football league pyramid.

Stavanger Oilers is the only western team in the top Norwegian ice hockey league, Fjordkraftligaen. It has won a total of seven Norwegian championship titles. The club plays its home matches at DNB Arena, which was opened in 2012.

The handball team Stavanger Håndball plays in the Norwegian second division.

Stavanger was the host of the 2009 beach volleyball SWATCH FIVB World Championships.

The Sørmarka Arena is an indoor multi-purpose ice rink used for (inter)national ice speed skating competitions.

Music
Every May, Stavanger is host to MaiJazz, the Stavanger International Jazz Festival. The International Chamber Music Festival takes place every August.

Stavanger is the home of the Stavanger Symphony Orchestra (SSO).  Covering another part of the musical spectrum, it is also home to gothic metal bands Theatre of Tragedy, Tristania, Sirenia and the singer Liv Kristine, and the black metal band Gehenna. Janove Ottesen and Geir Zahl, founding members of the alternative rockband Kaizers Orchestra, both live in Stavanger as well. Other notable acts from Stavanger include Kvelertak, Thomas Dybdahl & Sturle Dagsland.

Community art
Stavanger participates in the annual NuArt Festival, organized for national and international artists who operate outside of the traditional art establishment. Every September, a team of internationally acclaimed street artists contribute to "one of Europe’s most dynamic and constantly evolving public art events."

Tourism

Stavanger is a popular tourist destination, especially in summer. The hotels in the city have good occupancy year round due to a lot of commuters who travel to work and meetings in Stavanger. In recent years, Stavanger has also become one of the most popular ports of call for cruise ships, with the number of cruise ships increasing steadily, making Stavanger one of Europe's fastest growing ports of call for cruise ships north of the Mediterranean.

Especially in the summertime, Stavanger's harbour is full of large cruiseships: in 2011 Stavanger hosted 130 cruiseships. The Port of Stavanger is a popular stop on the route to the Norwegian Fjords. The charming city center is just a small walk from the quay.

Outdoor activities
There are not many outdoor activities in Stavanger itself, however, splendid opportunities are nearby in adjacent municipalities: Lysefjorden is particularly popular for hiking. Tourists typically visit places like Preikestolen (aka the Pulpit Rock), and Kjeragbolten. Preikestolen is a massive rock overhanging the fjord (604 metres below). Kjeragbolten is a rock wedged in the cliff approximately 1,000 metres above the fjord. The straight fall 1,000 metres down to the fjord makes Kjerag a very popular location for BASE jumping.

Not too far from Stavanger, alpine centers are available for skiers and snowboarders throughout the winter season.

Along the coast south of Stavanger there are a number of large, sandy beaches, including at Sola, within close reach from the city.

City center
Old Stavanger (Gamle Stavanger) is located right next to the city center and has a collection of 18th- and 19th-century wooden structures.

Stavanger domkirke (St. Swithun's cathedral) was built between 1100 and 1150 by the English bishop Reinald in Anglo-Norman style, and in the late 13th century a new choir was added in Gothic style, with a vaulted roof. The cathedral is the only Norwegian cathedral that is almost unchanged since the 14th century.

The city center itself is small and intimate, with narrow streets and open spaces protected from car traffic.

Notable people

Public service & business 
Just Henrik Ely (1759–1824), military officer, rep. at Norwegian Constitutional Assembly
Gabriel Schanche Kielland (1760–1821), businessman and ship owner
Peder Valentin Rosenkilde (1772–1836), merchant and rep. at Norwegian Constituent Assembly
Henrik Steffens (1773–1845), Norwegian philosopher, scientist, and poet
Lars Oftedal (1838–1900), priest, social reformer, politician; founded Stavanger Aftenblad
Christian Lous Lange (1869–1938), historian & political scientist; exponent of internationalism
Jacob Christian Petersen (1870-1964), priest, first modern-day Bishop of Stavanger in 1925-1940
Nicolai Rygg (1872–1957), economist and Governor of the Central Bank of Norway
Olaf Gjerløw (1885–1949), newspaper editor, edited Morgenbladet in 1920-1949
Thore Horve (1899–1990, naval officer, ran the Royal Norwegian Navy in 1946–1949
Håkon Nilsen (1913-1976), highly decorated war veteran of World War II, torpedo commander HNorMs Stord
Ingerid Gjøstein Resi (1901–1955), philologist, women's rights leader and politician
Sven Oftedal (1905–1948), physician, politician and Govt. minister
Guri Hjeltnes (born 1953), journalist, historian and academic
Anne Lise Ådnøy (born 1957), prelate, Bishop of Stavanger since 2019
Leif Johan Sevland (born 1961), politician, Mayor of Stavanger from 1995-2011
Aslak Sira Myhre (born 1973), journalist, director of the National Library of Norway since 2014
Afua Hirsch (born 1981), British journalist, broadcaster and former barrister

The Arts 

Alexander Kielland (1849–1906), realistic writer, one of "The Four Greats"
Peder Severin Krøyer (1851–1909), one of the Skagen Painters 
Frida Hansen (1855-1931), textile artist
Olaf Lange (1875–1965), painter
Henny Skjønberg (1886–1973), actress and stage director
Fartein Valen (1887–1952), composer
Henrik Grevenor (1896–1937), art historian and academic
Gunnar Eide (1920–2012), actor and theatre director
Gunnar Bull Gundersen (1929–1993), sailor, novelist, playwright and lyricist
Knut Husebø (born 1946), actor and visual artist
Frode Gjerstad (born 1948), jazz musician, plays alto saxophone
Ståle Kleiberg (born 1958), contemporary classical composer and musicologist
Mia Gundersen (born 1961), singer and actress
Sigvart Dagsland (born 1963), singer, pianist, and composer
Sveinung Bjelland (born 1970), classical pianist, soloist and Lieder accompanist
Hans-Peter Lindstrøm (born 1973), multi-instrumentalist, DJ, and producer
John Erik Kaada (born 1975), singer-songwriter, film score composer, multi-instrumentalist
Liv Kristine Espenæs (born 1976) and Carmen Elise Espenæs, metal singer-songwriters
Pia Tjelta (born 1977), Norwegian actress
Johan Harstad (born 1979), novelist, short story writer, playwright and graphic designer
Pål Sverre Hagen (born 1980), Norwegian stage and screen actor
Ingrid Dahle (born c. 1990), comedian and actress
Aurora (born 1996), singer, songwriter and record producer

Sport 

Kjell Schou-Andreassen (1940–1997), football manager
Svein Kvia (1947–2005), footballer
Erik Thorstvedt (born 1962), footballer
Asle Andersen (born 1972), football manager and player
Gunn-Rita Dahle Flesjå (born 1973), cross-country mountain biker
Cecilie Drabsch Norland (born 1978), Paralympic swimmer
Linda Grubben (born 1979), biathlete
Ane Stangeland Horpestad (born 1980), footballer
Ole Erevik (born 1981), handball player
Brede Hangeland (born 1981), footballer
Kjetil Jansrud (born 1985), alpine ski racer and Olympic champion
Alexander Kristoff (born 1987), cyclist
Sarah Louise Rung (born 1989), Paralympic swimmer
Aryan Tari (born 1999), chess grandmaster

Twin towns – sister cities

Stavanger is twinned with:

 Aberdeen, Scotland, UK
 Antsirabe, Madagascar
 Esbjerg, Denmark
 Eskilstuna, Sweden
 Estelí, Nicaragua
 Fjarðabyggð, Iceland
 Galveston, United States
 Houston, United States
 Jyväskylä, Finland
 Nablus, Palestine
 Netanya, Israel

See also
Czechoslovakia (band)

References

External links

Municipal fact sheet from Statistics Norway 
Municipality web site
Official city maps
Stavanger Web
Official web site of the region Stavanger 

 
Cities and towns in Norway
Populated coastal places in Norway
Jæren
Port cities and towns in Norway
Port cities and towns of the North Sea
Viking Age populated places
Municipalities of Rogaland